Western Park is a neighborhood in the Southwest-Redbird,  Oak Cliff area of Dallas, Texas, south of Cockrell Hill, Texas. It is predominantly Hispanic. Western Park has different regions, including Western Park, Kenwood to the south, the Highland Road Village Apartments and the Village Green to the east, and Mountain View Park to the north. It was founded in the early 1960s.

Geography
Even though the Dallas area is mostly flat, Western Park is built on a large hill. Its many varieties of trees—including small palm trees—block the view of Downtown Dallas that it would enjoy otherwise.

Boundaries
Western Park's boundaries are unofficial, but approximately lie along a former line of the Santa Fe railway to the south (owned by Dallas Area Rapid Transit, although no plans exist for its use as a transit line), Duncanville Road to the West, South Walton Walker Boulevard on the Southwest, another former railway east of South Cockrell Hill Road to the east (planned as the Chalk Hill Trail), and West Illinois Avenue to the north (including the neighborhood north of Illinois).

Notable residents
Big Cease and Dat Boy X of Houston's Hataproof Records both live in Western Park.

References

Neighborhoods in Oak Cliff, Dallas